Karnataka State Highway 93 (KA SH 93) is a state highway that runs through Belagavi, Uttara Kannada, Shivamogga districts in the Indian state of Karnataka. This state highway touches numerous cities like Khanapur,Alnavar, Haliyal, Yellapura, Sirsi, Siddapura, and Talaguppa.

References

Roads in Belgaum district
Roads in Uttara Kannada district
Roads in Shimoga district